Afdera Franchetti (born 8 July 1931) is an Italian baroness, descended from an old Jewish family of Venice which intermarried with the Rothschild family and who eventually converted to Roman Catholicism. Franchetti is known for being the fourth wife of American actor Henry Fonda.

Family
The Italian Jewish Franchetti family, from the 18th century, was one of the wealthiest families in the Mediterranean. 
Afdera Franchetti was the daughter of Baron Raimondo Franchetti, a famous explorer who travelled extensively in Ethiopia and charted hitherto unexplored territories (Dancalia) during the 1920s. On his return from an expedition to Ethiopia, his plane exploded over Cairo in 1935. Raimondo's grandmother was Sara Louise de Rothschild (1834–1924). Her brother, the Baron Raimondo Nanuk Franchetti, was a friend of author Ernest Hemingway, who hunted with him in Caorle Lagoon.

Marriage to Howard Taylor and Henry Fonda
Afdera Franchetti was married to Howard Taylor from 1954 to 1957. They met in Italy on a vacation. Afdera Franchetti was married to Henry Fonda (*1905) from 1957 to 1961; they were introduced to each other by Audrey Hepburn in Italy while he was filming War and Peace with Audrey and Mel Ferrer.  Audrey had been struggling with infertility and had sought advice from Afdera's sister, Simba. When she became pregnant straightaway, she felt a certain loyalty to the Franchetti Family. She befriended Afdera, which resulted in her meeting with Henry. Afdera was roughly 25 years old when she married Fonda; his eldest child, Jane, was 18 years old.

Later life
She was once arrested for drug smuggling, as detailed in her autobiography, for one "joint", which she brought in her luggage for a friend without knowing that possession of this small amount of marijuana was a serious offence.

References

Sources
Fonda, Afdera.  Never Before Noon  
Ghostwriter Clifford Thurlow on the Franchetti autobiography
Fonda family website
Video clip of Franchetti discussing the wedding of Camilla Parker Bowles

1931 births
Living people
Italian nobility
Italian emigrants to the United States
People from Greater Los Angeles
Franchetti family
Afdera